Atiya Fyzee or Atiya Fyzee-Rahamin; Atiya Begum; Shahinda; Atiya Begum Fyzee Rahamin (1 August 1877 – 4 January 1967) was an Indian author and the first woman from South Asia to attend the University of Cambridge.

Life
Fyzee was born in Constantinople in 1877 to an Ismaili Bohra family related to the Tyabjis.

Writings art and activism 
She came to London to attend a teachers training college and she arranged for her diary to be published in India in 1907. Fyzee did not complete the course in London. Noted for her intellectualism, Fyzee's correspondences impressed contemporaries including Muhammad Iqbal, Shibli Naumani, Abu Al-Asar Hafeez Jalandhari and Maulana Muhmmad Ali Jauhar.

Her letters to her sister were published later with bit of editing to tone down references of her affectionate platonic relationship with Muhammad Iqbal

There were contested gossips about her close friendships with the authors Shibli Nomani and Muhammad Iqbal before she married Samuel Fyzee-Rahamin.

1912 to 1948 
In 1912 Atiya Rahamin-Fyzee married Samuel Fyzee-Rahamin a bene Israeli Jew artist who converted to Islam to formalize his love relationship with her. After her marriage with Rahamin she traveled back to Europe and USA to visit art galleries. The couple also arranged exhibition on women's craft. She also addressed a gathering in one her visits about women in Indian history, and co-authored a book on Indian music with Rahamin and also choreographed two of Rahamins plays in London in 1940s.

In 1926 at an educational conference at Aligarh, Fyzee defied expectations of Purdah seclusion and addressed the gathering unveiled (without Hijab) to demand equal rights with men to go about on God's earth freely and openly.

1948 to 1967 Karachi, Pakistan 
Fyzee being neighbor of Jinnah in Mumbai, also closely linked with Muhammad Iqbal, senior founder of Pakistan movement happened to shift to Karachi with her husband and sister in 1948 on invitation of Jinnah who also allotted a palatial residence to them in Karachi.

They created an art and literary space at their new home which was named after their Mumbai residence.

Post Jinnah's death the couple Atiya and Samuel  were evicted from their house property allotted by Jinnah, also faced financial difficulties and had to live on assistance from other relatives abroad.

Death 

Fyzee died in much reduced circumstances in Karachi in 1967 and her husband died the following year. After they both died their home was open so that visitors could see their art collection. This continued until the 1990s when the collection was archived because the house was demolished.

Legacy 
An incomplete project of cultural center in Karachi at her later evicted property.

References

Lambert-Hurley, Siobhan and Sunil Sharma, Atiya's Journeys: A Muslim Woman from Colonial Bombay to Edwardian Britain. Oxford University Press.

External links
Details on Bibliothèque nationale de France
Overview on the Open University

1877 births
1967 deaths
Indian Ismailis
Sulaymani Bohras
Writers from Istanbul
Indian women writers
Pakistani women writers
Tyabji family
Expatriates from British India in the Ottoman Empire
Writers in British India

Md. Mahmudul Hasan, "Atiya: The Most Iconoclastic of the Fyzee Sisters", Literature at Portsmouth, URL: http://englishliterature.port.ac.uk/?p=765

Md. Mahmudul Hasan, “Islamic with Turkish Connections: Atiya’s and Zeyneb’s Counter-narratives to the West”, Journal of Muslim Minority Affairs, 25 March 2021, https://doi.org/10.1080/13602004.2021.1903160

Md. Mahmudul Hasan, “Travels to Metropolitan London: Experiences of Two Early Twentieth-century Muslim Women”, Interventions: International Journal of Postcolonial Studies, 25 Feb 2021, https://doi.org/10.1080/1369801X.2021.1892512